Hayden Creek may refer to:

 Hayden Creek (Lemhi River tributary), Idaho, United States
 Hayden Creek (Minnesota), United States
 Hayden Creek (Missouri), United States
 Hayden Creek (New York), United States